Loy Norrix High School is a high school located in Kalamazoo, Michigan, serving students from grades nine through twelve. It is one of two high schools in the Kalamazoo Public Schools district. The student body totals at approximately 1,550. The school is named for a former superintendent of Kalamazoo Public Schools and opened in 1961. Loy Norrix students are eligible for the Kalamazoo Promise, which provides reduced or free college tuition for students attending public and private colleges in Michigan.

History

Loy Norrix opened in 1960 after Kalamazoo Central High School graduated 800 students the year prior, the largest graduating class to that date. The school is named after former Superintendent Loy Norrix. The school has been dubbed the "Glass Castle", due to its almost completely glass frame, prominently featured in an advertisement for LOF Glass in the September 21, 1962 issue of Life Magazine. Loy Norrix is also home to the Freshman Academy, where freshmen are all housed in one wing of the school (the B wing).

Notable alumni

T. J. Duckett- Class of 1999. Professional football player
David Means - Class of 1980, author, O Henry Award winner.
Tim Nordwind- Class of 1994 musician- Bass Player "OK GO"
Jerome T. Youngman - Class of 1969, Musician, Producer, Composer
Bob Wood - Class of 1975, author and activist.
James Leo Ryan - Class of 1981, Actor, Broadway, Off-Broadway, Movies and Television

See also
 Kalamazoo Public Schools
 Kalamazoo Promise

References

External links
 Loy Norrix official website
 Kalamazoo Public Schools official website

Public high schools in Michigan
Educational institutions established in 1961
Schools in Kalamazoo, Michigan
1961 establishments in Michigan